Ponda  ), also known as Fondya, is a city and a municipal council in the north Goa district of Goa, India. Located in the central area of Goa, Ponda lies 28 km (17 miles) southeast of Panaji, the capital of Goa and 17 km (10.6 miles) northeast of Margao, the district headquarters. Ponda is also known as "Antruz Mahal" because of the presence of numerous famous temples and rich cultural heritage.

Geography

Ponda lies along the National Highway 4A, which connects Panaji to Belgaum in the neighboring state of Karnataka.

Demographics
According to the 2011 census of India, Ponda had a population of 22,664. Males constituted 51.8% of the population and females 48.2%. Ponda had an average literacy rate of 85.2%, higher than the national average of 74.0%, with male literacy at 86.7% and female literacy at 83.5%. In Ponda, 9.9% of the population was under 6 years of age.

Religion

Hinduism
There are many Hindu temples in and around Ponda.  The Temples of Shri Manguesh (Shiva), Shri Nagesh, Shri Ganapati, Shri Ramnath and the Goddesses Shri Shantadurga, Shri Mahalasa, Shri Mahalaxmi are all located nearby.

Christianity
St. Anne Church, Ponda, Goa is called ‘Santa Ana Igreja em Ponda, Goa’ in Portuguese. The St. Anne Church, Ponda, Goa is popularly called ‘The Ponda Church’ locally in Goa. The original Church of Ponda, dedicated to St. Anne and St Anthony, was founded in 1700. Ponda was then a mission station administered by the Jesuits. The present Ponda Church was built later. The parish of Ponda was entrusted to the pastoral care of members of the Order of Franciscans Minor in 1957. The present parochial residence of the Ponda Church was built in 1967 and the church sanctuary was enlarged and remodeled in 1987.

Chapel (with Chaplain) in the Parish of St. Anne Church, Ponda, Goa
Our Lady of Mount Carmel Chapel, Ponda, Goa

Chapels (without chaplains) in the Parish of St. Anne Church, Ponda, Goa
St. Sebastian Chapel, Durbhat, Ponda, Goa
St. Rock chapel , Bandora, Ponda, Goa
St. Anthony chapel, Khandepar, Ponda, Goa

Islam

The historic Safa Masjid is a mosque built in 1560 by the Bijapur ruler Ibrahim Adil Shah I about 2  km from the center of Ponda. It is one of two sixteenth-century Islamic monuments in Goa that survived the Portuguese Inquisition.

Jainism
The village Bandivade in Ponda was established by King Sripala. He also built a Jain temple of Neminatha in Ponda.

Government and politics
Ponda is part of Ponda (Goa Assembly constituency) and South Goa (Lok Sabha constituency).

Transport  

Ponda is connected by road to the capital of Goa Panaji, to the main railway junction of Margao and to the International Airport at Dabolim.
Regularly scheduled bus services to Panaji(Panjim), Margao and Vasco (near Dabolim) depart from the Kadamba Transport Corporation bus stand on the outskirts of the town. Buses to nearby villages and towns, as well as interstate buses, also depart from the same bus stand. There are buses regularly between Ponda and Dharwad, Hubballi and Belagavi run by the Kadamba Transport Corporation and the Karnataka State Road Transport Corporation. The National Highway 566 connects Ponda to Vasco via Verna. The National Highway 4A connects to Belgaum/Hubli and Panaji(Panjim).

References

External links

 National Institute of Construction Management and Research
 

Cities and towns in North Goa district